St Cyricius and St Julietta's Church, St Veep is a Grade I listed Church of England parish church in St Veep, Cornwall.

History and description
The parish church was originally dedicated to Saint Veep, cruciform in design and in 1269 belonged to Montacute Priory. Nothing remains of the church from this period

It was rebuilt in 1336 and rededicated to Saint Quiricus and Saint Julietta. The west tower appears to date from this rebuilding, but the rest of the church is late 15th century or early 16th century. Dendrochronological dating suggests c. 1460 for the nave and chancel roofs, but as late as 1540 for the north aisle roof.

Following the Prayer Book Rebellion of 1549, a number of well-known Cornish figures and priests were murdered or hanged in Cornwall. These included Richard Bennet, vicar of St Veep, under the direct orders of Anthony Kingston, Provost Marshal serving under King Edward VI.

Valuable church silverware, which had been deposited with Lloyds Bank of St Austell and subsequently lost, was rediscovered in 2015 at a storage facility near Glasgow. Items included a communion cup (dated 1579), silver flagon tankard (1737) and a silver plate (1738).

Parish status
The church is in a joint benefice with:
St Brevita’s Church, Lanlivery
St Winnow’s Church, St Winnow
Boconnoc Church
St Mary the Virgin's Church, Braddock
St Nectan's Chapel, St Winnow
St Bartholomew's Church, Lostwithiel

Monuments
Nicholas Courtney (d. 1589)

Organ
The organ has a pipe organ which was extensively rebuilt by J.W. Walker and Sons in 1871. A specification of the organ can be found in the National Pipe Organ Register.

Bells
The tower contains a peal of 6 bells all dating from 1770 by Pennington and Company. These were all cast in the churchyard and are the only known example in England of a Virgin Peal, in that they came out of the cast perfectly tuned.

References

Church of England church buildings in Cornwall
14th-century church buildings in England
Grade I listed churches in Cornwall